Lívia Tóth (born 7 January 1980) is a Hungarian runner who specializes in the 3000 metre steeplechase.

International competitions

Personal bests
800 metres - 2:04.86 min (2003)
1500 metres - 4:09.28 min (2003)
3000 metres - 8:58.53 min (2002)
3000 metre steeplechase - 9:30.20 min (2005)

Awards
 Hungarian athlete of the Year (1): 2005

References

1980 births
Living people
Hungarian female long-distance runners
Hungarian female middle-distance runners
Hungarian female steeplechase runners
Universiade medalists in athletics (track and field)
Universiade gold medalists for Hungary
Competitors at the 2003 Summer Universiade
Medalists at the 2005 Summer Universiade
20th-century Hungarian women
21st-century Hungarian women